Pierre de Rigaud de Vaudreuil de Cavagnial, marquis de Vaudreuil (22 November 1698 – 4 August 1778) was a Canadian-born colonial governor of French Canada in North America. He was governor of French Louisiana (1743–1753) and in 1755 became the last Governor-General of New France. In 1759 and 1760 the British conquered the colony in the Seven Years' War (known in the United States as the French and Indian War).

Life and work
He was born to the Governor-General of New France, Philippe de Rigaud Vaudreuil and his wife, Louise-Élisabeth, the daughter of Pierre de Joybert de Soulanges et de Marson, in Quebec. He was the uncle of Louis-Philippe de Vaudreuil.

Vaudreuil rose quickly through the New France military and civil service, in part owing to his father's patronage but also due to his own innate ability. Commissioned an officer of the French army while still a youth, in 1733 he was appointed governor of Trois-Rivières, and in 1742 of French Louisiana, serving there from to May 10, 1743 to February 9, 1753 and proving himself a skilled officer and capable administrator. While governor of Louisiana,  he married Jeanne-Charlotte de Fleury Deschambault, a widow about 15 years his elder.

He moved to France in 1753 before being appointed by King Louis XV as governor of New France in 1755.

The first governor of New France to be born in Canada, Vaudreuil's leadership was questioned and some of his orders were ignored by  officials of the French army such as Louis-Joseph de Montcalm, who judged him to be "too Canadian". Although Vaudreuil held supreme civil authority in Canada and was technically commander-in-chief of all French forces there, he clashed often with Montcalm, the military commander in the field, who resented his oversight role. The two men grew to detest one another, much to the detriment of the French war effort. Vaudreuil had excellent relations with the Canadian militia and with the Native-Canadian tribes allied with France; Montcalm looked down on both, preferring to rely upon French regular troops and making poor use of irregular Canadian and pro-French Native-Canadian forces.

After Montcalm lost to the British forces under Maj. Gen. James Wolfe at Quebec City in the Battle of the Plains of Abraham, Vaudreuil tried to rally resistance to the British but to no avail. He was forced to surrender Montreal on 8 September 1760 to Maj. Gen. Jeffrey Amherst.

One of several scapegoats for France's losses in the New World, Vaudreuil was imprisoned in the Bastille on March 30, 1762 but was released on May 18. He was joined by Bigot, Cadet, Pean, Breard, Varin, Le Mercier, Penisseault, Maurin, Copron, and others. Of the 21 men brought to trial, 10 were condemned, six were acquitted, three received an admonition and two were dismissed for want of evidence. Absent were 34, of whom seven were sentenced in default, and judgement was reserved in the case of the rest. Exonerated in a military tribunal held in December 1763, he was awarded a pension and military decoration.

After selling his Canadian seigneuries at Vaudreuil and Rigaud to his cousin, Michel Chartier de Lotbinière, Marquis de Lotbinière, he retired to his ancestral estate near Rouen, although the episode ruined his fortunes. He died in Paris on 4 August 1778.

His nephew Louis-Philippe de Vaudreuil was the second in command of the French naval units supporting the Americans during the American Revolution. He was present at the defeat of the British fleet by the French at the pivotal Battle of the Chesapeake during the siege of Yorktown in 1781, although he was later defeated by the Royal Navy at the Battle of the Saintes.

Vaudreuil was one of three governors-general of Canada known to have owned enslaved people. During his tenure, he owed 16 people, 13 of whom were Africans.

Legacy

In Literature
Vaudreuil is a menacing offstage presence in Kenneth Roberts' Arundel novels, Arundel and Rabble in Arms.

See also

Canadian Hereditary Peers
Articles of Capitulation of Montreal
Timeline of Quebec history
Philippe de Rigaud Vaudreuil
Louis-Philippe de Vaudreuil
Joseph Hyacinthe François de Paule de Rigaud, Comte de Vaudreuil

Notes

References
 Barron, Bill (1975). The Vaudreuil Papers: A Calendar and Index of the Personal and Private Records of Pierre de Rigaud de Vaudreuil, Royal Governor of the French Province of Louisiana, 1743-1753, New Orleans: Polyanthos, 543 p.
 Frégault, Guy (1952). Le Grand marquis : Pierre de Rigaud de Vaudreuil et la Louisiane, Montréal: Fides, 481 p.
 Frégault, Guy (1955). La Guerre de la Conquête, Montréal: Fides, 514 p.
 Roy, Pierre-Georges (1938). La Famille de Rigaud de Vaudreuil, Lévis, 216 p. (online)
 Le Jeune, Louis, "Pierre de Cavagnal, marquis de Vaudreuil", in Dictionnaire général de biographie, histoire, littérature, agriculture, commerce, industrie et des arts, sciences, mœurs, coutumes, institutions politiques et religieuses du Canada, volume II, Ottawa: Université d’Ottawa, 1931, pp. 764–767. (online)
 Casgrain, Henri-Raymond (1895). Lettres du marquis de Vaudreuil au chevalier de Lévis, 215 p. (online)
 Casgrain, Henri-Raymond (1890). Extraits des archives des Ministères de la marine et de la guerre à Paris : Canada, Correspondance générale, MM. Duquesne et Vaudreuil, Gouverneurs-generaux, 1755-1760, Québec : L.J. Demers, 322 p. (online)
 Vaudreuil, Pierre de Rigaud de (1763). Mémoire pour le marquis de Vaudreuil, grand-croix de l'Ordre royale & militaire de Saint-Louis, ci-devant gouverneur & lieutenant général de la Nouvelle France, Imprimerie de Moreau, 46 p.

External links
CyberAcadie : Biographie :  Pierre de Rigaud de Vaudreuil de Cavagnial,  marquis de Vaudreuil (in French).
Canadian Military Heritage - Mutual Dislike Between Colonial and Metropolitan Officers.
1759 From the Warpath to the Plains of Abraham (Virtual Exhibition).
National Battlefields Commission (Plains of Abraham).
Archives of Pierre de Rigaud, marquis de Vaudreuil Cavagnial (série Pierre de Rigaud, marquis de Vaudreuil Cavagnial, MG18-G2) are held at Library and Archives Canada

Further reading
 Crouch, Christian Ayne (2014). Nobility Lost:  French and Canadian Martial Cultures, Indians, and the End of New France, Ithaca: Cornell University Press. 

1698 births
1778 deaths
French Canadian people of the French and Indian War
Governors of Louisiana (New France)
Governors of New France
Marquesses of Vaudreuil-Cavagnal
Prisoners of the Bastille
18th-century Canadian politicians
Canadian slave owners
French slave owners